José Mauro de Vasconcelos (February 26, 1920 – July 24, 1984) was a Brazilian writer.

Biography 
José Mauro was born in Rio de Janeiro on February 26, 1920. His family was very poor, and when he was still very young, he migrated to Natal where relatives took care of him. Entering the Medical faculty, Mauro abandoned the course of studies in his second year and returned to Rio de Janeiro. There he worked as a boxing instructor and even as a painter's model.

Mauro initiated his literature with the novel Banana Brava. His greatest success was his novel My Sweet Orange Tree (Meu Pé de Laranja Lima) that tells about his own personal experiences and the shocks he suffered in his childhood with the abrupt changes of life. The story centers around little José, a 5-year-old boy who is being raised in a poor family with many brothers and sisters in Bangu, in the state of Rio de Janeiro. Partly because he rarely sees his parents, who are out to work long hours and only come back home at night, José plays all sorts of pranks on his neighbours and friends, leading his older brothers and sisters to think he is a naughty child. He can find little comfort and support in his own family, except from his older sister Gloria, for whom José is a kind of protégé. When moving houses with his family, José finds a little tree of sweet orange in the backyard, which he ignores at first for being too small to climb, but then becomes its friend once he discovers he can actually communicate with the tree. His only other friend is a Portuguese man from Trás-os-Montes called Manuel Valadares.

Mauro was part Indian and part Portuguese. He passed his childhood in Natal. When he was 9 years old, he learned to swim, and with pleasure he still remembers the days when he threw himself into the waters of the Potengi River to train for swimming competitions. Mauro frequently went to the sea. He won many swimming competitions and liked to play soccer and to climb trees. Mauro's first job, from 16 to 17 years old, was as sparring partner of featherweight boxers. He then started working on a farm in Mazomba, carrying bananas, before becoming a fisherman and living on the coastline in Rio de Janeiro. He later moved to Recife, where he became an elementary teacher and taught at a fishermen's center.

His prodigious story-telling skills, fabulous memory, brilliant imagination and experience of life led Mauro Vasconcos to feel he should become an author, and he started to write novels when he was 22 years old.

As a writer,  he had his own methods. First he would choose the settings where the characters would live. Then he would move to these places and do rigorous research. To write the novel Arara Vermelha, Mauro traveled  in the wilderness. Next, he would structure the whole novel, determining even the dialogues. He had a memory that allowed him to remember every little detail of his imagined scenario for a long time. "When the story is entirely made in imagination", reveals the author, "is when I begin to write. I only work I have the impression that the novel is exiting from all the pores of the body."

Mauro relates that after finishing writing the first chapter, he passes to the conclusion of the novel, without even elaborating the plot. "That, he explains "because all the chapters are already produced mentally. It is not really important writing a sequence, like alternating the order. In the end everything goes well". Mauro was a cinema actor and worked in films such as Carteira Modelo 19, Fronteiras do Inferno, Floradas na Serra, Canto do Mar (of which he wrote the screenplay), Na Garganta do Diablo, and A Ilha. He won many prizes, such as the Saci prize for best supporting actor, the Saci prize for the best actor of the year, and the Governo do Estado prize for best actor of the year. His novels Arara Vermelha and Vazante were filmed.

The writer 
Although a possessor of a pleasant and light literature, creating a success with the public, the works of José Mauro de Vasconcelos are not fully recognized in Brazil.

The French critic Claire Baudewyns affirms that "ce qui confère aux œuvres de José Mauro de Vasconcelos une poésie particulière née de l'alchimie entre monde réel et monde imaginaire." ("what confers on the works of José Mauro de Vasconcelos a particular poetry, is born of the alchemy between real world and imaginary world", in free translation).

He wrote :

 1942 : Banana Brava
 1945 : Barro Blanco
 1949 : Longe da Terra
 1951 : Vazante
 1953 : Arara Vermelha
 1955 : Arraia de Fogo
 1962 : Rosinha, Minha Canoa
 1963 : Doidão
 1964 : O Garanhão das Praias
 1964 : Coração de Vidro
 1966 : As Confissões de Frei Abóbora
 1968 : O Meu Pé de Laranja Lima (My Sweet Orange Tree)
 1969 : Rua Descalça
 1969 : O Palácio Japonês
 1970 : Farinha Órfã
 1972 : Chuva Crioula
 1973 : O Veleiro de Cristal
 1974 : Vamos Aquecer o Sol
 1975 : A Ceia
 1978 : O Menino Invisível
 1979 : Kuryala: Capitão e Carajá

Legacy 
Because it was written in plain language, the book My Sweet Orange Tree became a popular choice for primary schools in Brazil to adopt it in their curricula. It is claimed to be the book that sold the most in that country's literary history. In the first few months of its publication in 1968, this book has sold 217,000 copies.

My Sweet Orange Tree has also been filmed as soap operas and movies in Brazil, including the 1970 film and the April 2013 re-make by director Marcos Bernstein.

After his death, José Mauro de Vasconcelos has given his name to numerous libraries and cultural association all over Brazil, including a library in the city of São Paulo.

In 2015, Google Doodle commemorated his 95th birthday.

References 

Lusophone Wikipedia

1920 births
1984 deaths
Brazilian male novelists
20th-century Brazilian novelists
Deaths from pneumonia in São Paulo (state)
20th-century Brazilian male writers